Licto is a volcanic field in Ecuador, close to the town of Licto.

The scoria cones named Licto, Loma Bellavista and Tulabug form the field.

The cones are constructed by andesite and basaltic andesite and may be of Pleistocene-Holocene age.

References 

 

Volcanic fields
Andean Volcanic Belt